Fomichi is a rural locality (a village) in Posadskoye Rural Settlement, Kishertsky District, Perm Krai, Russia. The population was 80 as of 2010. There are 6 streets.

Geography 
Fomichi is located 8 km northeast of Ust-Kishert (the district's administrative centre) by road. Rogozino is the nearest rural locality.

References 

Rural localities in Kishertsky District